Edwin Vladimir Miranda (born January 28, 1981) is a retired Salvadoran footballer.

Career

College
Miranda grew up in Los Angeles, California, and played four years of college soccer at Cal State-Northridge, where he was twice named Big West Conference Defender of the Year.

Professional
Miranda was drafted in the sixth round (54th overall) by Dallas Burn in the 2004 MLS SuperDraft. Miranda was unable work his way into the Dallas first team squad, and transferred to the Portland Timbers of the USL First Division for the 2004 season. After two seasons with the Timbers, Miranda transferred to the Puerto Rico Islanders.

In early 2009 it was announced that the Islanders and Miranda had decided to mutually part ways, as they could not come to an agreement as to the players salary. On April 12, 2009, Miranda signed a one-year contract with USL First Division team Miami FC, and played 25 games before being released at the end of the season.

He signed for the Hollywood United Hitmen of the USL Premier Development League in 2010, and played in 16 games for the team, helping them to the 2010 PDL playoffs. Following the conclusion of the 2010 PDL season Miranda returned to the Puerto Rico Islanders, playing four regular season games for Tropa Naranja towards the end of their successful championship-winning USSF D-2 Pro League campaign.

Miranda signed with USL Pro club Los Angeles Blues on April 7, 2011. He scored one goal in 18 games for the Blues, but was released by the team following the conclusion of the 2011 USL Pro season, and subsequently signed to play for the Los Angeles Misioneros in the USL Premier Development League in 2012. He made his debut for his new club on April 22, a 4-1 opening-day loss to Fresno Fuego.

International
Miranda received his first called up to the El Salvador national football team in December 2008. He received his first cap on January 24, 2009, in a UNCAF Nations Cup match against Belize when he came on as a late sub for Salvador Coreas.

Honors

Puerto Rico Islanders
USSF Division 2 Pro League Champions (1): 2010
USL First Division Commissioner's Cup (1): 2008

References

External links
 Miami FC bio
 

1981 births
Living people
People from La Paz Department (El Salvador)
American sportspeople of Salvadoran descent
Salvadoran emigrants to the United States
Association football midfielders
American soccer players
Salvadoran footballers
El Salvador international footballers
FC Dallas draft picks
California State University, Northridge alumni
Cal State Northridge Matadors men's soccer players
Portland Timbers (2001–2010) players
Puerto Rico Islanders players
Miami FC (2006) players
Hollywood United Hitmen players
Orange County SC players
LA Laguna FC players
C.D. FAS footballers
A-League (1995–2004) players
USL First Division players
USL League Two players
USSF Division 2 Professional League players
USL Championship players
2009 UNCAF Nations Cup players